Mohammad-Ali Allahdadi (1963 – January 18, 2015) was a brigadier general in the Islamic Revolutionary Guard Corps and a military officer in the Quds Force.

A veteran of Iran–Iraq War, he was killed in January 2015 Mazraat Amal incident.

Military career

Iran–Iraq War 
Still a teenager, Allahdadi joined Irregular Warfare Headquarters, an irregular warfare unit under command of Mostafa Chamran, as a guerrilla. After fighting in Operation Tariq al-Qods, he moved to Ground Forces of the Islamic Revolutionary Guard Corps's 41st Sarallah Division of Kerman as Lieutenant Colonel, under Qasem Soleimani. During the war, he was promoted to Colonel.

Balochistan conflict 
He was involved in Balochistan conflict.

Syrian civil war 
In circa 2012, he was asked by previous Major General Qasem Soleimani to serve in Syrian Civil War. Allahdadi had traveled to Syria to "provide consultation" and was an adviser to the Syrian army. 

He was killed in January 2015 Mazraat Amal incident, alongside six Hezbollah Fighters. Following his death, the Revolutionary Guard released a statement saying "Zionists should await devastating thunder of the IRGC" and Iran's Ministry of Foreign Affairs sent a "warning letter" to Israel via United States.

A senior Israeli security source told Reuters "Israeli forces believed they were attacking only low-ranking Hezbollah members". Officially, Israel has not commented on the attack.

Ten days after his death, Hezbollah launched an attack on an Israeli military convoy in the Shebaa Farms area.

Legacy 
2015 Southern Syria offensive was code-named "Allahdadi for Quneitra Martyrs".

References 

1963 births
2015 deaths
Islamic Revolutionary Guard Corps second brigadier generals
People from Kerman Province
Islamic Revolutionary Guard Corps personnel of the Iran–Iraq War
Iranian Irregular Warfare Headquarters guerrillas
Quds Force personnel
Islamic Revolutionary Guard Corps personnel of the Syrian civil war
People from Sirjan